Đinh Thị Trà Giang (born June 26, 1992) is a Vietnamese volleyball player who plays for the Vietnam women's national volleyball team and the former captain of Vietnam team and Kinh Bắc VC.

Career 
Giang played for the club Thông tin Liên Việt Post Bank at 2017 Lien Viet Post Bank Cup and loan with VTV Bình Điền Long An at 2018 VTV9 - Binh Dien Cup. She is the captain of Vietnam for 2018 tournaments and Kinh Bắc VC at 2018 Vietnam League.

Clubs 
  Hà Nội VC (2005–2007)
  Vietsov Petro (2007–2013)
  Hà Phú Thanh Hoá (2014–2017, 2021)
  Thông tin Liên Việt Post Bank (2017) (loan)
  VTV Bình Điền Long An (2018) (loan)
  Kinh Bắc Bắc Ninh (2018–2019)
  Than Quảng Ninh (2020)
  Geleximco Thái Bình (2022)
  Vietinbank VC (2023-now)

Awards

Clubs
 2010 Vietnam League -  Runner-Up, with Vietsov Petro
 2013 Vietnam League -  Bronze medal, with Vietsov Petro
 2019 Vietnam League -  Bronze medal, with Kinh Bắc Bắc Ninh
 2022 Vietnam League -  Champion, with Geleximco Thái Bình

References

1992 births
Living people
People from Lạng Sơn Province
Vietnamese women's volleyball players
Vietnam women's international volleyball players
Southeast Asian Games silver medalists for Vietnam
Southeast Asian Games medalists in volleyball
Competitors at the 2009 Southeast Asian Games
Volleyball players at the 2018 Asian Games
Asian Games competitors for Vietnam
Middle blockers
21st-century Vietnamese women